Christine Kalmer (born 10 February 1986) is a South African long distance runner who specialises in the marathon. She competed in the women's marathon event at the 2016 Summer Olympics. She finished in 96th place with a time of 2:48:24.

References

External links
 

1986 births
Living people
South African female long-distance runners
South African female marathon runners
Athletes (track and field) at the 2016 Summer Olympics
Olympic athletes of South Africa
People from Roodepoort